The Rogozarski R-313 (Рогожарски Р-313 in Serbian) was a two-seat twin-engined monoplane designed as a fighter/light bomber/reconnaissance aircraft in Yugoslavia before World War II. It was designed and built at the Rogozarski factory in Belgrade.

Design, construction and development
The Rogozarski R-313 was a two-seater twin-engined fighter/light bomber/reconnaissance aircraft. It was powered by two in-line Walter Sagitta IIR engines, both fitted with a compressor; each was capable of 493 hp. The elliptical, wooden fuselage was covered in plywood which was also used to 'skin' the round-tipped, trapezoidal wings. The engine nacelles also housed the landing gear. The tail-wheel was, like the main landing gear, retractable. The fuel tank was located in the centre section between the wings. The reconnaissance variant of this aircraft was due to be equipped with a camera, a radio, a fixed 20mm cannon and a single FN 7.9mm machine gun, flexibly mounted. As a light bomber, the plane would carry four 106 kg 'Stankovic' bombs inside the fuselage.

Operational history
This aircraft did not get beyond the prototype stage. However, such characteristics as speed, rate of climb and distance required for take-off compared favourably with contemporary fighters. Only the relative lack of engine power let it down. Adopting the more powerful Daimler-Benz DB 601 or the Rolls-Royce "Merlin" was discussed but came to nothing with the outbreak of war. A total of 25 aircraft were planned, both reconnaissance and light bomber versions.

The prototype became part of 603 training squadron which was located at Grab, near Trebinje during the April war. It was damaged and abandoned attempting to take-off from Grab on 12 April 1941. A month later, the Germans took control and sold the machine to the Croats who had taken over the 'Ikarus' factory. They renamed the aircraft "Независни" ("Independent"); after repairs, a test flight was carried out on 19 May 1942.

Sabotage was then detected, so serious that further repairs could not be carried out. Thus ended the plane which was popular in literature as the "Yugoslav moskito" Although it was designed and built long before its legendary counterpart.

Operators

Royal Yugoslav Air Force 1 aircraft

Air Force of the Independent State of Croatia 1 ex-Royal Yugoslav Air Force

Specifications

See also

Notes

References

 Ч. Јанић; Р-313, Београд,
 О. Петровић.; Војни аероплани Краљевине СХС/Југославије (Део II: 1931–1941.), Лет 3/2004. Београд, 2004
 Wcoll/Barker; Combat aircraft WWII, p. 220; The Yugoslav Mosquito, Air Enthusiast, Vol.1 No 2, July 1971
 Љ. Тешић; Први и последњи лет „Независног“, Фронт бр.931, 4.06.1976
 Encyclopedia of World Aircraft, Prospero Books, .
 Јанић, Чедомир; Огњан Петровић (2010.). Век авијације у Србији 1910-2010 225 значајних летилица (на ((sr))). YU-Београд: Аерокомуникације. .
 Ненадовић, Мирослав (1967.). Експериментална истраживања у развоју концепције летилица (на ((sr))). YU-Београд: САНУ (Посебна издања)- Споменица књига 30, стр.167-189

External links

Rogozarski R-313
www.goldenyears.ukf.net
www.airwar.ru
www.fligerweb.com
www.palba.cz
Engine Walter Sagitta 

Rogožarski aircraft
1930s Yugoslav bomber aircraft
1930s Yugoslav fighter aircraft
Reconnaissance aircraft
Low-wing aircraft
Aircraft first flown in 1940
Twin piston-engined tractor aircraft